The 1975 Jacksonville State Gamecocks football team represented Jacksonville State University as a member of the Gulf South Conference (GSC) during the 1975 NCAA Division II football season. Led by second-year head coach Clarkie Mayfield, the Gamecocks compiled an overall record of 7–3 with a mark of 5–3 in conference play, and finished tied for third in the GSC.

Schedule

References

Jacksonville State
Jacksonville State Gamecocks football seasons
Jacksonville State Gamecocks football